Clarkia rostrata is a species of flowering plant in the evening primrose family known by the common name beaked clarkia.

Distribution
The wildflower is endemic to California, where it is known from the California oak woodlands of the Sierra Nevada foothills around the Merced River in Mariposa County.

Description

The inflorescence bears opening flowers below closed, hanging flower buds. The reddish or purplish sepals stay fused together as the flower opens from one side. The fan-shaped petals are lavender-pink, lightening to nearly white at the bases, where it turns reddish purple. There are 8 stamens, some tipped with large lavender anthers and some with smaller, paler anthers.

References

External links
Calflora Database: Clarkia rostrata (Beaked clarkia)
Jepson Manual eFlora (TJM2) treatment of Clarkia rostrata
UC CalPhotos gallery

rostrata
Endemic flora of California
Flora of the Sierra Nevada (United States)
Natural history of the California chaparral and woodlands
Natural history of Mariposa County, California
~
Plants described in 1970